Burning is combustion, a high-temperature reaction between a fuel and an oxidant.

Burning or burnin' may also refer to:

Arts, entertainment, and media

Music

Albums 
 Burnin''' (Gil Grand album)]], 2002
 [[Burnin' (Patti LaBelle album)|Burnin (Patti LaBelle album)]], 1991
 [[Burnin' (Sonny Stitt album)|Burnin''' (Sonny Stitt album)]], 1960
 [[Burnin' (Bob Marley and the Wailers album)|Burnin (Bob Marley and the Wailers album), 1973
 Burnin' (John Lee Hooker album), 1962 
 Burning (album), a 1983 album by Shooting Star
 Burning: A Wish, a 2001 album by Lacrimas Profundere

Songs 
 "Burnin'" (Cue song), 1997
 "Burnin'" (instrumental), by Daft Punk from Homework, 1997
 "Burnin'", by Carol Douglas, 1978
 "Burnin'", by Calvin Harris & R3hab from Motion, 2014
 "Burnin'", by Paul Johnson, 1987
 "Burnin'", by The Bill Sheppard Combo, 1962
 "Burning" (Accept song), from Breaker, 1981
 "Burning" (Alcazar song), from Disco Defenders, 2009
 "Burning" (Maria Arredondo song), from Not Going Under, 2004
 "Burning" (Sam Smith song), from The Thrill of It All, 2017
 "Burning", by E.M.D. from Rewind, 2010
 "Burning", by Mia Martina from Devotion, 2012
 "Burning", by Monrose from Strictly Physical, 2007
 "Burning", by Orchestral Manoeuvres in the Dark from the B-side of "Sailing on the Seven Seas", 1991
 "Burning", by The War on Drugs from Lost in the Dream, 2014
 "Burning", by Robbie Rivera, 2002

Other uses in arts, entertainment, and media
 Burning (2021 film), a 2021 Australian documentary film directed by Eva Orner
 Burning (2018 film), a 2018 South Korean drama film directed by Lee Chang-dong
 "Burning" (short story), a 1978 story by Orson Scott Card

Technology
 Burning, nuclear fusion
 Burning, optical disc authoring
 Dodging and burning, photographic techniques

Other uses
 Death by burning, a form of execution
 Defrauding
 Dodging and burning
 Sunburn

See also 
 Burn (disambiguation)
 Burned (disambiguation)
 Burning off
 Burning Star (disambiguation)
 Fire
 Heat
 The Burning (disambiguation)